Pablo Sebastián "Tato" Rodríguez (born October 6, 1978) is an Argentine former basketball player. He spent most of his career at Marplatense Club Peñarol, where he played during 15 seasons until September 2011. Rodríguez was forced to leave the professional activity after he was diagnosed with heart problems.

Rodríguez's health problem was similar to the illness that affected other basketball players such as Fabricio Oberto and Leonardo Gutiérrez, but unlike him, Oberto and Gutiérrez could continue playing basketball.

Rodríguez played 610 matches for Peñarol, scoring 7,106 points (including 996 three-point field goals). He also won three Liga Nacional championships.

On November 24, 2011, Peñarol paid tribute to "Tato" Rodríguez retiring his emblematic number 8 jersey. The retirement ceremony was held before the match that Peñarol disputed against Estudiantes de Bahía Blanca in Mar del Plata.

Career
 Peñarol (1994–98, 1999–2003, 2004–11)
 Ciclista Juninense (1998–99)
 Boca Juniors (2003–04)

Honours

Club
Boca Juniors
 Liga Nacional (1): 2003–04

Peñarol
 FIBA Americas League (2): 2007–08, 2009–10
 Liga Nacional (2): 2009–10, 2010–11
 Torneo Súper 8 (2): 2006, 2009
 Copa Desafío (1): 2006–07

Individual
 Best three-point field goal average in second division (TNA): 1998–99
 Best three-point field goal average in first division: 1999–2000
 Best assistance player of the season: 2004–05, 2005–06
 Number 8 retired by Peñarol: (2011)

References

1978 births
Living people
Sportspeople from Mar del Plata
Argentine men's basketball players
Ciclista Juninense basketball players
Point guards